Love on the Wire (1977) is the fourth album by Clover.  It was released on Vertigo Records in the UK.  In the United States, it was released on Mercury Records.

William Ruhlmann of AllMusic rated it 3 out of 5 stars, noting that it had a "harder rock edge" than the previous albums.

Track listing
"Hearts Under Fire" (Alex Call, Sean Hooper, Clover) – 5:37
"Southern Belles" (Alex Call, Hugh Cregg, Sean Hooper, Clover) – 3:24
"Oh Señorita" (Alex Call, John McFee, Clover) – 4:24
"Still Alive" (Alex Call, Hugh Cregg, Clover) – 3:51
"Keep On Rollin" (Jerry Leiber, Mike Stoller) – 2:40
"California Kid" (Alex Call, Clover) – 3:40
"Easy Love" (Alex Call, Hugh Cregg, John McFee, John Ciambotti, Robert John Lange, Sean Hooper) – 3:56
"Ain’t Nobody Own Nobody’s Soul" (Alex Call, Hugh Cregg, Robert John Lange, Clover) – 3:47
"From Now On" (Alex Call, John McFee, John Ciambotti, Clover) – 3:37
"Travellin’ Man" (Jerry Fuller) – 4:10

Personnel

Clover 
 Alex Call – lead vocals, guitar
 Huey Lewis – lead vocals, harmonica
 John McFee – lead guitar, slide guitar, pedal steel, vocals
 Sean Hopper – keyboards, percussion, vocals
 John Ciambotti – Fender bass, vocals
 Tony Braunagel – drums

Technical 
Robert John Lange, Ted Sharp - recording engineer
Bill Price, Robert John Lange - mixing engineer
Peter Gravelle - photography

References

1977 albums
Clover (band) albums
Albums produced by Robert John "Mutt" Lange
Vertigo Records albums
Mercury Records albums